Noureddine Meziane (born 28 September 1962) is an Algerian boxer. He competed at the 1988 Summer Olympics and the 1992 Summer Olympics.

References

External links
 

1962 births
Living people
Algerian male boxers
Olympic boxers of Algeria
Boxers at the 1988 Summer Olympics
Boxers at the 1992 Summer Olympics
Place of birth missing (living people)
Competitors at the 1987 Mediterranean Games
Mediterranean Games gold medalists for Algeria
Mediterranean Games medalists in boxing
Light-middleweight boxers
21st-century Algerian people